Finley is an unincorporated community in Pushmataha County, Oklahoma, 10 miles northeast of Antlers.

A United States Post Office was established at Finley, Indian Territory on April 30, 1903, and was named for Sidney W. Finley (1869-1914), local merchant and first postmaster.

Finley was originally called Cedar Church, then Old Cedar Church, the name of a longstanding Choctaw Indian Methodist congregation established there during Indian Territory days. The congregation took its name from nearby Big Cedar Creek—then known as Cedar Creek. The church appears to have waned during the latter days of the Choctaw Nation, probably giving rise to the opportunity to rename the settlement after its first postmaster.

At the time of its founding, Finley was located in Jack's Fork County, a part of the Pushmataha District of the Choctaw Nation.

Finley successfully retains its status as a cohesive community, long after losing its school. It hosts cemetery clean-up days and community dinners in its community center. It continues to have a post office and store.

References 

Unincorporated communities in Oklahoma
Unincorporated communities in Pushmataha County, Oklahoma